The Neuchâtel trolleybus system  is part of the public transport network in Neuchâtel, Switzerland.  Opened in 1940, it gradually replaced the urban lines of the Neuchâtel tramway network.

The system currently also serves the neighbouring municipalities of Auvernier, Peseux, Corcelles-Cormondrèche, Hauterive, Saint-Blaise and La Tène.  It is operated by Transports publics Neuchâtelois (TN), which also runs an interurban tramway to Boudry and various conventional bus lines.

Current routes 
As of 2019 there are three trolleybus routes in Neuchâtel (route 107 is a radial route; the other two routes are cross-city routes):

History

The individual sections of trolleybus line in Neuchâtel went into service as follows:

Note:  Opening dates above indicate the start of trolleybus service, where known.  In cases of new trolleybus routes converted from tram lines, trams were replaced by a temporary motorbus service while the overhead wiring was modified, and thus the first day of trolleybus service did not immediately follow the last day of tram service.

Opened in 1949, route 4 included interurban trolleybus service to Cernier, in the Val-de-Ruz, replacing a tramway as far as Valangin and motorbus service of the Val-de-Ruz transport company (VR) between there and Cernier. However, most journeys on TN route 4 operated only between Neuchâtel and Valangin. Trolleybus route 4 and VR's Valangin–Cernier section both closed on 2 November 1969, and that was the final day of trolleybus service between the Val-de-Ruz and Neuchâtel.

Route 6 was converted to diesel buses on 19 March 2001 and discontinued entirely in June 2001, with realignment of the roadway in front of the railway station following.

Routes 1 (city centre – St. Blaise) and 2 (city centre – Serrières) were through-routed for many years, from the opening of route 1 in 1957 until 1981, with trolleybuses displaying route number "1" when bound for St. Blaise and "2" when bound for Serrières. They were separated in 1981, but re-connected in 1985, and the full route became route 1 at the latter date, with route "2" ceasing to exist.

On 8 July 1991, route 1 replaced route 3, making route 1 Cormondrèche–Place Pury–St. Blaise–Marin, and the Place Pury to Serrières section was taken over by route 7. On 29 May 1994, route 7 reverted to operating Place Pury–Hauterive, and the designation route "2" was revived for the Place Pury–Serrières section.  At the opposite end of route 7, the trolleybus wires were extended from Hauterive to Marin, for access to a new depot opening there in September 1994, and starting on 3 October 1994 three route 7 trips per day operated through to or from Marin. In June 1996, route 7 began serving Marin at all times and days except evenings and Sundays, but with half of its scheduled non-rush-hours trips still terminating at Hauterive.

Fleet 

Neuchâtel's present trolleybus fleet consists of 36 exclusively articulated vehicles, the last two-axle vehicles having been withdrawn in spring 1992.

The type BGT 5-25 fleet originally comprised 21 vehicles, but fleet nos. 103, 104, 106, 110 and 111 have since been replaced by low-floor vehicles.  As there were no low-floor trolleybuses in the fleet prior to the delivery of the BGT-N2C type Swisstrolleys, lines 1 and 7 were operated between 2004 and 2010 by a mixed fleet of trolleybuses and low-floor diesel buses.  Under that arrangement, the travelling public was offered at least some barrier-free trips – which were identified in the timetable.

See also

List of trolleybus systems in Switzerland
Trams in Neuchâtel

References

Notes

Books

External links

 Association Neuchâteloise des Amis du Tramway (Neuchâtel Association of Friends of the Tramway) – official site 
 Trolleybus city: Neuchâtel (Switzerland) Trolleymotion.
 

Transport in Neuchâtel
Neuchatel
Neuchatel
1940 establishments in Switzerland